The Pherrins River is a tributary of the Clyde River, flowing in Essex County and Orleans County in northern Vermont in United States.

The valley of the river Pherrins is a convenient passage for connecting the Island Pond to the Norton Pond which is the head of water of the Coaticook River flowing to the northeast across the border of Quebec and Vermont.

Geography 
The source of the river is located in the area of Warren's Gore, Vermont, on the northwest flank of Bluff Mountain in Essex County, Vermont. This source is located at:
  West of a summit of the Bluff Mountain;
  Southwest of the summit of the Middle Mountain;
  Northeast of the border of Orleans County;
  North of Island Pond.

From its source, the river Pherrins flows on  according to the following segments:
  toward the Northwest racing down the cliff on  down to the railway crossing the valley of Pherrins River and the Coaticook River;
  toward the Southwest, crossing two small lakes up to the confluence of a stream (from the North);
  toward Southwest, up to the limit of Orleans County;
  toward the Southwest, collecting the waters of a mountain stream (from the Northwest) up to the Pine Brook (from the East);
  to the South up to the discharge of Underpass Pond (from the East);
  to the South up to the limit of Essex County;
  to the Southeast up to its confluence

This confluence is located on the west side of Island Pond.

Toponymy
The toponym "River Pherrins" was formalized on October 29, 1980, at the Geographic Names Information System (GNIS) of US federal government.

References

External links
 http://www.northernforestcanoetrail.org/tripplanner/

See also 

Lake Memphremagog, a body of water straddling the Quebec and Vermont
Clyde River (Vermont), a stream
Warren's Gore, Vermont
Brighton, Vermont
List of rivers of Vermont
List of rivers of the United States

Rivers of Vermont
Rivers of Orleans County, Vermont
Bodies of water of Essex County, Vermont